Garcinia loureiroi is a tree species in the family Clusiaceae.  The Catalogue of Life lists no subspecies.

Its sour fruit and leaves are used widely in Cambodian cuisine, specifically in a version of the dish samlar machu.

References

External links 
 

loureiroi
Trees of Cambodia
Trees of Vietnam
Flora of Indo-China